Kim Jin-Yi (born 20 June 1993) is a South Korean handball player. She plays on the South Korean national team and participated at the 2011 World Women's Handball Championship in Brazil.

In 2012, she competed at the 2012 Women's Junior World Handball Championship in the Czech Republic.

References

External links

1993 births
Living people
South Korean female handball players
Asian Games medalists in handball
Handball players at the 2014 Asian Games
Asian Games gold medalists for South Korea
Handball players at the 2016 Summer Olympics
Olympic handball players of South Korea
Universiade medalists in handball
Medalists at the 2014 Asian Games
People from Taebaek
Universiade silver medalists for South Korea
Medalists at the 2015 Summer Universiade
Handball players at the 2020 Summer Olympics
Sportspeople from Gangwon Province, South Korea